Phosphoric may refer to:

Phosphoric acid
Phosphoric anhydride, see phosphorus pentoxide

See also 
Phosphorus